Suzanne L. Charlton (born 1962) is a British BBC weather forecaster and daughter of footballer Bobby Charlton.

Early life
Born in Urmston, Lancashire, Charlton attended Loreto Grammar School, a Roman Catholic girls' grammar school in Altrincham, with her sister Andrea. Charlton graduated from the University of Reading in 1985 with a degree in Physics and Meteorology,

Career
In September 1985 Charlton joined the Met Office in Bracknell, where she worked as a computer programmer.

In 1987, she transferred to the London Weather Centre as a forecaster, joining the BBC weather team in March 1989. In the summer of 1990, she spent three and a half months working as a forecaster with the RAF in Germany. She appeared on a range of channels including Breakfast News from 1992. She took maternity leave from 1999, which she extended to bring up her son.

Charlton returned to BBC Weather bulletins in March 2006, appearing regularly on BBC News 24, BBC Radio 4, BBC World and BBC One. She left the BBC Weather Centre in March 2007.

She is a fellow of the Royal Meteorological Society.

Personal life

Charlton is the daughter of former Manchester United and England footballer, Sir Bobby Charlton and his wife Norma Ball, and the niece of the late Leeds United and England footballer Jack Charlton. She married in 1994 in Macclesfield. Her husband is Nick Brown, a tennis coach and former player. She has one son, Robert (named after his grandfather) (born in November 1998) and lives in Hitchin, Hertfordshire.

Charlton is a keen sports fan, with her special interests being football, tennis, and skiing. She also played hockey for her university. Charlton competed in national horse-riding events, and is a group instructor with the Riding for the Disabled Association.

References

External links

Suzanne Charlton Bio TVNewsRoom

1962 births
Living people
Alumni of the University of Reading
English meteorologists
People from Hitchin
People from Urmston
BBC weather forecasters